Salvador is a Christian band. The band began with Nic and Josh as part of the worship band in their home church located in north east Austin, Texas, King of Glory church. They sing in both English and Spanish.

Members

Current members 
 Nic Gonzales – lead vocals, guitars
 Chris Bevins – keyboards, backing vocals 
 Josh Gonzales – bass, backing vocals 
 Ben Cordonero – drums, percussion, backing vocals 
 Robert Vilera – percussion 
 Edwin Santiago – trumpet, flugelhorn

Former members 
 Adrian Lopez – keyboards, backing vocals 
 Art "Pescueeetz" Gonzales – drums
 Eliot Torres – percussion, backing vocals 
 Pablo Gabaldon – trumpet, flugelhorn 
 Billy Griego – trombone 
 Damian Martin – guitars 
 Roberto Acuña – drums
 Chamo Lopez – percussion 
 Joel Cavazos – guitars 
 Joseph Cavazos
 Jared Solis – saxophones, trombone 
 John Morales
 Jonathan Rangel
 Mike Montañez

Discography

Studio albums

Singles

Awards

2004

Dove Award at the 35th GMA Dove Awards: Spanish Album of the Year - Con Poder

2008

On the heels of their new album release AWARE, the band along with TobyMac, Third Day, Kelly Clarkson and others performed at the Papal Youth Rally on April 19, 2008 in Yonkers, New York.

Style
Over time the sound has changed from pure Latin funk to more mainstream contemporary and at times a heavier sounds of rock and occasionally the extreme sound of heavy metal riffing in later years. During live shows Salvador tries to stay with their pure up-tempo Latin sound, while inserting a few more contemporary fan favorites. The band has evolved over the years using a variety of different members to accompany the different range of music and direction the band has taken, such as Latin funk, contemporary, Rock and Roll, and hard rock.

In 1998, the band contributed to the AIDS benefit compilation album Onda Sonora: Red Hot + Lisbon produced by the Red Hot Organization.

References

External links
Salvador - Official site
Salvador database on Jesusfreakhideout.com
Extended information

Christian rock groups from Texas
Latin American music
Musical groups from Austin, Texas
Musical groups established in 1999
Inpop Records artists
1999 establishments in Texas